The Swedish Painters' Union (SMF or Målarna) is a trade union representing painters and decorators in Sweden.

The union was founded on 2 October 1887 at a meeting in Stockholm, and originally had 800 members.  It affiliated to the Swedish Trade Union Confederation in 1899, and by 1907 had grown to 4,298 members.  After a decade with fluctuating membership, it began growing again, reaching a maximum membership of 22,582 in 1966.  Since then, membership has steadily fallen, and in 2019 stood at 10,918.

References

External links
 

Swedish Trade Union Confederation
Trade unions in Sweden
Trade unions established in 1887
1887 establishments in Sweden
Painters' and decorators' trade unions